Sivaji Productions was an Indian film production and distribution company based in Chennai. Established in 1958, it was involved mainly in Tamil and Hindi-language films until 2010.

History 
Sivaji Productions company is owned by Prabhu and his brother Ramkumar Ganesan. It is named after their father, the thespian Sivaji Ganesan. Notable films released under their banner includes Puthiya Paravai, Vietnam Veedu, Thanga Pathakkam, Thirisoolam, Aruvadai Naal, Vetri Vizha, Mannan and Chandramukhi.

Sivaji Productions was started in 1956 by Dr. Sivaji Ganesan and his brother Sri V.C. Shanmugam. It was first started as a distribution company and distributed many of Dr. Sivaji's movies. In 1958, Sivaji Productions co-produced its first film Amardeepam which was a Hindi remake of Amardeep. Its first solo production was Puthiya Paravai in 1964 with Dr. Sivaji in the lead role.

Since then, Sivaji Productions has produced about 18 films till date.

After Sri V.C. Shanmugam's death in 1986, Dr. Sivaji's son Mr. G.Ramkumar took over Sivaji Productions.

Sivaji Productions has also ventured into the production of television serials. It has produced two serials, Kokila engey Pogirral in Tamil and Seethama Maeyamma in Telugu and is currently producing a Tamil serial called Thavam for Kalaingar TV.

During the success meet of the P. Vasu-directed Mannan (1992), Rajinikanth announced that he would act in Sivaji Productions' 50th film. However, following their 49th film Rajakumaran, Sivaji Productions went on hiatus for 12 years. In September 2004, Rajinikanth was impressed with Vasu's Kannada film Apthamitra (2004) and wanted to remake it in Tamil with Sivaji Productions producing. The remake, titled Chandramukhi, became Sivaji Productions' 50th film. The film received positive reviews from critics and became a successful venture at the box-office.

Their next project was initially announced with Gautham Vasudev Menon as director. However, the film's production failed to take off, with repeated dates being announced by the directors for the film's first schedule throughout 2009. Subsequently, Menon was removed from the project by the producers due to the film's inactivity, with directors Dharani, Vishnuvardhan and Saran leading the race to take over.

In January 2009, the film was reannounced as Asal by Prabhu and the story was subsequently changed with Saran being signed up as the film's director. The film received negative reviews from critics and became a failure at box-office.

Filmography 
Films

Television
Kokila Enge Pogiraal (Sun TV)
Thavam (Kalaignar TV)

References 

Film production companies based in Chennai
Mass media companies established in 1958
Film distributors of India
Film production companies of India
1958 establishments in Madras State
Television production companies of Tamil Nadu